Michael R. Williams is an American bishop of the Anglican Church in North America. A retired U.S. Air Force chaplain, he was consecrated in 2018 as bishop suffragan in the ACNA's Jurisdiction of the Armed Forces and Chaplaincy (JAFC).

Biography
Williams married his wife, Becky, in 1976, and they have three daughters and five granddaughters. In 1977, he received his B.A. in political science from Iowa State University. He joined the U.S. Air Force as an officer after graduation.

After receiving a call to ordained ministry, he attended Trinity School for Ministry and was ordained to the priesthood in the Episcopal Church in North Pole, Alaska, while serving at Eielson Air Force Base. From 1991 to 1995, he served at St. Paul's Episcopal Church in Grand Forks, North Dakota. Williams joined the chaplaincy of the Air Force in 1995 and served until his retirement in 2009, at which time he joined the staff of the ACNA's Jurisdiction of the Armed Forces and Chaplaincy. 

He was consecrated as bishop suffragan alongside Mark Nordstrom on April 12, 2018, in Birmingham, Alabama. Williams serves as director of education, training, and formation for the Anglican chaplains. Like other JAFC bishops, his canonical residence was in the Church of Nigeria North American Mission until 2021, when the JAFC completed the canonical process for removing its residence in the Church of Nigeria and becoming canonically resident in the ACNA. Since 2009, Williams has also been a priest or bishop-in-residence at St. George's Anglican Church in Colorado Springs, a congregation of the Anglican Diocese of All Nations.

References

External links
St. George's Anglican Church profile page

Living people
21st-century Anglican bishops in the United States
Bishops of the Anglican Church in North America
Year of birth missing (living people)